The 1914 Dublin County Council election was held on Monday, 8 June 1914.

Following the election P. J. O'Neill was elected Chairman. The election saw Nationalists take both divisions comprising Rathmines for the first time.

Council results

Division results

Balbriggan

Blackrock

Castleknock

Clondalkin

Coolock

Dalkey

Donnybrook

Dundrum

Finglas

Kingstown

Lucan

Lusk

Pembroke West

Rathcoole

Rathfarnham

Rathmines East

Rathmines West

Stillorgan

Swords

References

1914 Irish local elections
1914